Degas is a rayed crater on Mercury at latitude 37.5 N, longitude 127 W. Its diameter is . It was named after the French impressionist painter Edgar Degas in 1979. The rays consist of light colored material blasted out during the crater's formation. Craters older than Degas are covered by the ray material, while younger craters are seen superimposed on the rays. Degas forms a crater pair with Brontë to the north.  Both lie near the center of Sobkou Planitia.

The crater's floor contains cracks that formed as the pool of impact melt cooled and shrank. The high-reflectance material on the walls and in the central portion of the crater probably has a composition distinct from that of the crater floor and surroundings. The illumination conditions and down-slope movement of eroded material exposing fresh rock also contribute to the bright appearance.

Degas is one of the largest craters of the Kuiperian system on Mercury. The largest is Bartók crater.

Views

References

External links

Impact craters on Mercury